The Penang State Legislative Assembly is the legislature of the Malaysian state of Penang. It is a unicameral institution, consisting of a total of 40 elected lawmakers representing single-member constituencies throughout Penang. The state legislature, whose members are called State Assemblymen, convenes at the Penang State Assembly Building in Penang's capital city of George Town. The Penang State Executive Council, the executive branch of the Penang state government, is drawn from among the State Assemblymen.

Out of the 40 seats, 33 are held by the Pakatan Harapan (PH) ruling coalition after the 2018 State Election. Within the coalition, the Democratic Action Party (DAP) holds 19 seats, the People's Justice Party (PKR) 12 seats, and the National Trust Party (Amanah) holds two seats. The PH coalition thus commands a supermajority in the legislature. Barisan Nasional (BN) in accordance with the new unity government supports the PH government through a confidence-and-supply agreement. BN currently holds two seats.

Meanwhile, the opposition is formed by the Perikatan Nasional (PN) from the Pan-Malaysian Islamic Party (PAS), which currently controls just one seat.

Current composition

Seating arrangement
The seating arrangement of the Penang State Legislative Assembly is as follows.

Role
The Penang State Legislative Assembly's main function is to enact legislation and policies relating to the State List and Joint List as defined in the Federal Constitution. Its members also provide oversight on the state's executive branch of government, ensuring the state departments and agencies enforce the aforementioned legislation. Debates in the Assembly are presided over by the Speaker.

The leader of the party or coalition with a majority in the Assembly is appointed as the Chief Minister by the Tuan Yang Terutama Tun Yang di-Pertua Negeri of Penang. The Chief Minister heads the state's executive, known as the State Executive Council, whose members are also drawn from the Assembly.

Committees
The State Assembly also consists of committees to handle administrative matters. The committees include:
 Public Accounts Committee
 Committee on Privileges
 House Committee
 Standing Orders Committee
 Constitution Committee

Speakers Roll of Honour
The following is the Speaker of the Penang State Legislative Assembly Roll of Honour, since 1959:

Election pendulum
The 14th General Election witnessed 37 governmental seats and 3 non-governmental seats filled the Penang State Legislative Assembly. The government side has 25 safe seats and 2 fairly safe seats. However, none of the non-government side has safe and fairly safe seat.

List of Assemblies

See also
 Penang State Assembly Building
 Penang state government
 Constituencies of Penang
 Constitution of Penang

References

External links 
 Penang State Assembly Portal

 
P
Unicameral legislatures
Politics of Penang